USRC Virginia may refer to the following ships of the United States Revenue Service:

, was one of the first ten Revenue Service cutters in service from 1791 to 1798
, was a Revenue Service cutter in service from 1798 to 1807

See also
 for ships of the US Navy

Note
Ships of the US Revenue Cutter Service were often placed under the authority of the US Navy during times of war.

Ship names